The Order of Merit of the Grand Duchy of Luxembourg (French: Ordre de Mérite du Grand-Duché de Luxembourg) is an order of merit of Luxembourg, instituted on 23 January 1961 by Grand Duchess Charlotte. Grand Master of the order is the Grand Duke of Luxembourg. Besides the five classes, a gilt medal can also be bestowed.

Grades 
The order is composed of 5 grades :
 Grand Cross
 Grand Officer
 Commander
 Officer
 Knight

Members 

Members of the Order of Merit of Luxembourg include the following:

Grand Cross:
 Antonios Chatzidakis, former General Manager of the NATO Maintenance and Supply Agency NAMSA
 Gabriele Albertini, Italian politician
 Boutros Boutros-Ghali, former secretary-general of the United Nations
 Jos Chabert, vice-president of the parliament of Brussels
 Didier Reynders
 Konstantin Zhigalov, Deputy Minister of Foreign Affairs of Kazakhstan
 Astrid Lulling, Luxembourg politician, retired member of the European Parliament for Luxembourg
 John L Murray, Chief Justice of Ireland

Grand Officer:
 Wesley Clark, former Supreme Allied Commander
 Tommy Koh, Singaporean Ambassador-at-Large, diplomatist and law professor
 Nikolaos van Dam, Dutch ambassador to Indonesia
 Jean-Marie Leblanc, former director of the Tour de France
 Mikis Theodorakis, music composer
 Joseph Weyland, permanent representative of Luxembourg to NATO
 Gabriele Albertini, member of the European Parliament
 James G. Stavridis, former commander of USEUCOM and Supreme Allied Commander Europe
 José Lello, member of Portuguese Parliament, former President of NATO PA

Commander:
 Nana Mouskouri, Greek and international singer
 Vicky Leandros, Greek and international singer
 Thomas Schaidhammer, United States Army Colonel, Berlin Attache
 Svend-Aage Nielsen, Danish businessman
 Carl Christian Nielsen, Danish businessman
 Erik Ader, Dutch ambassador to Norway
 Michel Carpentier, director general of the European Commission
 Robert Engels, Dutch ambassador to Finland
 Barend ter Haar, Dutch diplomat
 Pascal Lamy, European Commissioner
 Gilbert Renault, French resistance hero
 Simon Wiesenthal, Nazi-hunter
 Gerald Newton, Professor of German at the University of Sheffield
 Michel Monnier, French diplomat
 Wicher Wildeboer, Netherlands ambassador to Cuba and Jamaica
 Robert DeFalco, American business executive
 Alexei Mordashov, Russian businessman

Officer
 Hanna Pri-zan, Israeli chairman of Peilim portfolio management
 Alphonse Berns, Luxembourgish ambassador
 Jacques Devillers, ArcelorMittal – LCE – Head of reporting
 Gerard Druesne, Director-General of the European Institute of Public Affairs
 Nicolas Majerus, Luxembourgish politician for the CSV party and heart specialist

Knight
 Josy Linkels, painter
 Fernand Roda, painter
 Jean-Claude Schlim
 Marianne Majerus, Anglo-Luxembourgish photographer
 Marie-Joseé Stark

Gallery

References 
 Le Mémorial 13 du 14 April 1961, Arrêté grand-ducal du 23 janvier 1961 portant institution de l'Ordre de Mérite du Grand-Duché de Luxembourg

Merit of the Grand Duchy of Luxembourg, Order of
Recipients of the Order of Merit of the Grand Duchy of Luxembourg
1961 establishments in Luxembourg
Awards established in 1961
Orders of merit